The County of Wölpe was the territorial lordship of a noble family in the Middle Ages in the Middle Weser Region near Nienburg/Weser which folded in 1302. The seat of the counts of Wölpe was the castle site at Erichshagen-Wölpe on the Wölpe stream in the borough of Nienburg in north Germany. The castle itself no longer exists.

Important representatives 
 Bernard II of Wölpe (1176–1221), founder of Neustadt am Rübenberge and Mariensee Abbey
 Iso of Wölpe (1167–1231), Prince-Bishop of Verden

Sources 
 Marcus René Duensing: Die Chronik der County of Wölpe, Diepenau 1999, 
 Ernst Andreas Friedrich: Wenn Steine reden könnten. Band IV, Landbuch-Verlag, Hannover 1998, 
 Dieter Riemer: counts und Herren im Erzstift Bremen im Spiegel der Geschichte Lehes, Bremerhaven/Hamburg 1995 (Diss. phil. Oldenburg) S. 141 ff

External links 
History of the County of Wölpe 

Counties of the Holy Roman Empire
Former states and territories of Lower Saxony
Nienburg (district)
Castles in Lower Saxony
Medieval Germany